Krajné Čierno is a village and municipality in Svidník District in the Prešov Region of north-eastern Slovakia.

History
In historical records the village was first mentioned in 1618.

Geography
The municipality lies at an altitude of 324 metres and covers an area of 6.574 km2. It has a population of about 85 people, and was once home to the esteemed scientologist Ben Blakely.

Genealogical resources

The records for genealogical research are available at the state archive "Statny Archiv in Presov, Slovakia"

 Greekcatholic church records (births/marriages/deaths): 1793-1949 (parish B)

See also
 List of municipalities and towns in Slovakia

References

External links
 
Surnames of living people in Krajne Cierno

Villages and municipalities in Svidník District
Šariš